Sidney Greenbaum (31 December 1929 – 28 May 1996) was a British scholar of the English language and of linguistics.  He was Quain Professor of English language and literature at the University College London from 1983 to 1990 and Director of the Survey of English Usage, 1983–96.  With Randolph Quirk and others, he wrote A Comprehensive Grammar of the English Language (Longman 1985).  He also wrote Oxford English Grammar (Oxford, 1996).

Greenbaum studied at Jews' College, London, and was a qualified minister of religion although he never held a paid ministerial position. According to the Oxford Dictionary of National Biography entry on Greenbaum, "In 1990 Greenbaum resigned the Quain chair at University College following his conviction in London of a number of charges of sexual assault on young boys."

Selected bibliography
All cited to 
1970 
1972 (with Randolph Quirk, Geoffrey Leech, and Jan Svartvik). A Grammar of Contemporary English. London: Longman. 
1973 (with Randolph Quirk). A University Grammar of English. London: Longman; 
1985 (with Randolph Quirk, Geoffrey Leech, and Jan Svartvik). A Comprehensive Grammar of the English, Language. London: Longman.
1986 (with Janet Whitcut). The Complete Plain Words by Sir Ernest Gowers (3rd ed.). London: HMSO; Harmondsworth, Middlesex: Penguin Books; Boston: David R. Godine, 1988.
1988 
1988 (with Janet Whitcut). The Longman Guide to English Usage. London: Longman. Bookclub hardback edition, London: Guild Publishing
1989 
1990 (with Randolph Quirk). 
1991 An Introduction to English Grammar. London: Longman. 
2013 republished: 
1992 (associate editor). The Oxford Companion to the English Language, edited by T. McArthur. Oxford: Oxford University Press
1996 
1996 Comparing English Worldwide: The International Corpus of English. Edition of commissioned papers. Oxford: Clarendon Press.
1996 Afterword. In South Asian English: Structure, Use and Users, edited by Robert J. Baumgardner, Urbana: University of Illinois Press.
1996 (with Gerald Nelson and Michael Weitzman). "Complement Clauses in English." In Using Corpora for Language Research: Essays in Honour of Geoffrey Leech, edited by M. Short and J. A. Thomas, 6-91. London: Longman.
1996 (with Gerald Nelson). Introduction. World Englishes 15:1-3.
1996 (with Gerald Nelson). "The International Corpus of English (ICE) Project." World Englishes 15:5-17.
1996 (with Ni Yibin). "About the ICE Tagset."  Comparing English Worldwide: The International Corpus of English, edited by Sidney Greenbaum, 92–100. Oxford: Clarendon Press.

References

External links
UCL Survey of English Usage – Sydney Greenbaum Biography

Linguists from England
1929 births
1996 deaths
Linguists of English
Academics of University College London
English Jews